Parcham is one of the factions of the People's Democratic Party of Afghanistan.

Parcham may also refer to:
 Parcham (magazine), Persian language political magazine published in Iran between 1942 and 1944
 Parcham-e Qadim, village in Gilvan rural district, Iran
 Parcham Party of India, political party in India

See also